The 1994 MTV Video Music Awards aired live on September 8, 1994, honoring the best music videos from June 16, 1993, to June 15, 1994. The show was hosted by Roseanne Barr at Radio City Music Hall in New York City, and this would be the last time there was a female host for the VMAs until Chelsea Handler hosted in 2010. Kurt Cobain, frontman of grunge band Nirvana, was honored this night after his death on April 5.

Michael Jackson and Lisa Marie Presley opened the show by Michael giving a speech. They ended it by taking a long kiss in front of everyone. In another notable moment, David Letterman escorted Madonna onto the stage and told the singer to watch her language, poking fun at Madonna's controversial appearance on the Late Show with David Letterman five months earlier.

R.E.M. was, for the second time in their careers, the biggest winner of the night, taking home four technical awards for their video "Everybody Hurts."  Closely following were hip-hop group Salt-n-Pepa  and rock band Aerosmith, both of which earned three moonmen that night.  Aerosmith's video for Cryin', in fact, won the two main awards of the night, Video of the Year and Viewer's Choice, making it the second video in VMA history to achieve this feat.  This would also be the last time that the nominees for Viewer's Choice were the same as those for Video of the Year, as MTV discontinued this rule the next year.

In terms of nominations, meanwhile, Aerosmith was the night's biggest nominee, earning a total of nine nominations for two of their videos:  "Cryin'" received four general nominations, while "Amazing" earned five professional ones.  Right behind them were R.E.M., whose video for "Everybody Hurts" was the night's most nominated video with seven nominations, and newcomer Björk, who received six nominations for "Human Behaviour."

Background
MTV announced in late June that the 1994 Video Music Awards would be held on September 8 at Radio City Music Hall, marking the ceremony's return to New York City for the first time since 1986 and to Radio City for the first time since 1985. Nominees were announced at a press conference held at New York City Hall on July 13. For the first time since the ceremony's inception, MTV chose not to syndicate the ceremony to broadcast television. The ceremony broadcast was preceded by the 1994 MTV Video Music Awards Opening Act. Hosted by Kurt Loder and Tabitha Soren with reports from Cindy Crawford, Juliette Hohnen, and Alison Stewart, the broadcast featured red carpet interviews, pre-taped features on Roseanne's VMA preparations and New York City's music landmarks, a pre-taped interview with Courtney Love, and a remix of New York City hip-hop music produced by Grandmaster Flash.

Performances

Presenters
 Michael Jackson and Lisa Marie Presley – opened the show and welcomed the audience
 Tom Jones – presented Best Female Video
 Coolio and Björk – presented Best Dance Video
 Bill Bellamy, Kennedy and Rudy Giuliani  – appeared in a vignette about Viewer's Choice voting procedures 
 Adam Sandler and Sandra Bullock – presented Best Video from a Film
 Beavis and Butt-Head – appeared in some pre-commercial break vignettes
 Natalie Merchant and Soundgarden (Chris Cornell and Kim Thayil) – presented Breakthrough Video
 Jann Wenner – presented the Lifetime Achievement Award
 Ed Lover and Doctor Dré – appeared in a vignette about Viewer's Choice voting procedures
 Melissa Etheridge and Brendan Fraser – presented Best New Artist in a Video
 Mark Messier and Daisy Fuentes – presented Best Direction in a Video
 Roseanne (host) – introduced the winners of the professional categories
 Naomi Campbell and Denis Leary – presented Best Metal/Hard Rock Video
 Billy Corgan – presented the Video Vanguard Award
 Public Enemy (Chuck D and Flavor Flav) – presented Best Rap Video
 Fab 5 Freddy and Daisy Fuentes – appeared in a vignette about Viewer's Choice voting procedures
 Ben Stiller and Lisa Loeb – presented Best Group Video
 Sheryl Crow and Stephen Dorff – introduced the International Viewer's Choice Award winners
 VJs Gastão Moreira (Brasil), Kristiane Backer (Europe), Hannah (Japan) and  Ruth Infarinato (Latin America) – announced their respective region's Viewer's Choice winner
 Toni Braxton and Tony Bennett – presented Best Alternative Video
 Bill Bellamy and Kennedy – presented the Viewer's Choice Award
 Cindy Crawford and Jon Stewart – presented Best R&B Video
 Queen Latifah – presented Best Male Video
 Krist Novoselic – paid a special tribute to Kurt Cobain
 David Letterman – accompanied Madonna on stage (and also appeared in a pre-commercial vignette with Beavis and Butthead)
 Madonna – presented Video of the Year
 John Goodman, Laurie Metcalf, Michael Fishman, Sara Gilbert, Sarah Chalke, Glenn Quinn, and Johnny Galecki – appeared in a post-credits scene on the Roseanne set commenting on the ceremony and its host

Winners and nominations
Nominees were selected by members of the music industry. Winners in general categories were selected by 500 members of the music industry and, for the first time, 500 MTV viewers. Winners in professional categories were selected by members of the music industry. Winners in the Viewer's Choice categories were selected by viewers, with the U.S. winner chosen via a phone poll conducted in the days prior to and during the ceremony.

Winners are in bold text.

See also
1994 MTV Europe Music Awards

References

External links
 Official MTV site

1994
MTV Video Music Awards
MTV Video Music Awards
1994 in American music